South Holland District Council in Lincolnshire, England is elected every four years.

Political control
The first election to the council was held in 1973, initially operating as a shadow authority before coming into its powers on 1 April 1974. Political control of the council since 1973 has been held by the following parties:

Leadership
The leader of the council since 2003 has been:

Council elections
1973 South Holland District Council election
1976 South Holland District Council election
1979 South Holland District Council election (New ward boundaries)
1983 South Holland District Council election
1987 South Holland District Council election
1991 South Holland District Council election (District boundary changes took place but the number of seats remained the same)
1995 South Holland District Council election
1999 South Holland District Council election (New ward boundaries)
2003 South Holland District Council election
2007 South Holland District Council election (New ward boundaries)
2011 South Holland District Council election
2015 South Holland District Council election
2019 South Holland District Council election

District result maps

Changes between elections

2015-2019 
Conservative councillor Robert Clark (Donington, Quadring and Gosberton ward) died in February 2018. A by-election will be held on 3 May.

References

External links

 
Politics of South Holland
Council elections in Lincolnshire
District council elections in England